Prospect Hill is a historic plantation house located near Fredericksburg, Caroline County, Virginia. The property is entirely surrounded by lands belonging to Santee. It was built about 1842, and is a two-story, five bay, double pile, brick dwelling. It has a high hipped roof and four interior end chimneys.  It features a wide single front entrance door framed by unfluted Roman Doric order columns supporting a plain entablature.  Also on the property is a contributing slave house.

It was listed on the National Register of Historic Places in 1976.

References

Plantation houses in Virginia
Houses on the National Register of Historic Places in Virginia
Houses completed in 1842
Houses in Caroline County, Virginia
National Register of Historic Places in Caroline County, Virginia